The 2011–12 season is Hyderabad cricket team's 78th competitive season. The Hyderabad cricket team is senior men's domestic cricket team based in the city of Hyderabad, India, run by the Hyderabad Cricket Association. They represent the region of Telangana in the state of Andhra Pradesh in domestic competitions.

Competition Overview

Squads
 Head Coach : Sunil Joshi
 Fielding Coach : Noel David

 
Joshi replaced M. V. Sridhar as the Hyderabad coach ahead of the 2011–12 season.
 Irani Cup
Ojha got selected to the Rest of India squad for the 2011 Irani Cup, a first-class cricket competition in India.

NKP Salve Challenger Trophy
Ojha got selected to the India Blue squad and Suman to the India Green squad for the 2011-12 NKP Salve Challenger Trophy, a List-A cricket tournament in India.

Duleep Trophy
Ojha, Quadri and Akshath got selected to the South Zone squad for the 2011-12 Duleep Trophy, a first-class cricket tournament in India.

Deodhar Trophy
Ashish, Ojha, Ravi Teja and Akshath got selected to the South Zone squad for the 2011-12 Deodhar Trophy, a List-A cricket competition in India.

Indian Premier League
The local franchise, Deccan Chargers retained Yadav, Ashish, Bhandari and Ravi Teja and signed Quadri and Akshath in the player's draft while the Mumbai Indians retained Suman and got Ojha during the trading window from the Deccan Chargers for the 2012 Indian Premier League, a professional Twenty20 cricket league in India.

England Tour Match

The England cricket team began their tour to India with two List A warm-up games against the Hyderabad Cricket Association XI (HCA XI), led by Dwaraka Ravi Teja, at Hyderabad. The HCA XI played their first match on 8 October 2011 as Ravi Bopara's fluent 73 off 82 balls and four-wicket haul by Steven Finn set up a 56-run win for the England. It was much comprehensive win for England in the second warm-up match as Jonny Bairstow's unbeaten century set the target of 368 for the HCA XI while Scott Borthwick's fifer bowled out the Hyderabad XI to 114 that registered the HCA XI's second consecutive loss to the England in as many matches.

Matches

Syed Mushtaq Ali Trophy
The Hyderabad team, led by Dwaraka Ravi Teja, began their campaign in the Syed Mushtaq Ali Trophy, a Twenty20 tournament in India, with a loss against the Kerala at Chennai on 16 October 2011. The Hyderabad batsmen were troubled by the Kerala bowlers at the start though the steady half century from Syed Quadri pushed them to 119 while the Kerala's chase was perfectly anchored by VA Jagadeesh's 49 that helped them to survive the scare of losing four quick wickets at the end to complete the chase with three wickets to spare. Ravi Teja's 81 off 55 balls led the Hyderabad to 160 while Pragyan Ojha and Quadri hampered the Andhra's chase as the Hyderabad registered a 35-run win in their second match. Second consecutive half century from Ravi Teja and a combined effort from the Hyderabad bowlers helped the Hyderabad register a nine-wicket win over the Goa in their third match. In the fourth match, Robin Uthappa's knock of 92 in 36 balls destroyed the Hyderabad bowling attack as he led Karnataka to 202. In reply, the Hyderabad lost wickets in the middle to the Karnataka spinners as they were bowled out for 112 and register their second loss in the tournament. A solid partnership from the openers and a combined performance from the bowlers helped the Tamil Nadu register a 63-run win against the Hyderabad in their final zonal match as the Hyderabad finished fourth in the South Zone and failed to qualify for the knockout stage with two wins and three losses.

Points Table
South Zone

  Top two teams advanced to knockout stage.
 Points system : W = 4, T/NR = 2, L = 0.

Matches
Zonal Stage

Statistics
Most runs

 Source: Cricinfo
Most wickets

 Source: Cricinfo

Ranji Trophy

The Hyderabad team, led by Dwaraka Ravi Teja, began their campaign in the Ranji Trophy, the premier first-class cricket tournament in India, with a draw against the Jharkhand at Hyderabad on 3 November 2011. They finished inside top-2 of Group B in the Plate League to advance to the knockout stage with two wins, two draws and a loss. They got promoted to the Elite-League for the 2012–13 Ranji Trophy after defeating the Vidarbha through the first-innings lead and also advanced to the Elite knockout stage. They were eliminated in the quarter-final where the Rajasthan was advanced through the first innings lead in the drawn match.

Points Table
Plate League Group B

  Top two teams advanced to knockout stage.
 Points system : Win by an innings or 10 wickets = 6, Win = 5, Draw with first innings lead = 3, Draw with first innings deficit = 1, No Result = 1, Loss = 0.

Knockout stage

Matches
Group Stage

Plate League Semi-final

Quarter-final

Statistics
Most runs

 Source: Cricinfo
Most wickets

 Source: Cricinfo

Vijay Hazare Trophy
The Hyderabad team, led by Dwaraka Ravi Teja, began their campaign in the Vijay Hazare Trophy, a List-A cricket tournament in India, with a win against the Kerala at Bengaluru on 20 February 2012. The Kerala put up a strong total with the century from Rohan Prem but the partnership between Akshath Reddy and Ibrahim Khaleel helped the Hyderabad chase down the target with two wickets to spare. The incisive fifer from Pragyan Ojha helped bowl out the Andhra for 107 as the Hyderabad eased to a six wicket win in their second match. Swapnil Asnodkar's knock of 127 helped the Goa set the target of 311 but the unbeaten ton from Ravi Teja and a quick fifty from Ashish Reddy helped the Hyderabad see off their target with five overs to spare and secure their third win in as many matches. The Hyderabad lost their first match in this tournament as Robin Uthappa's 120 and Ganesh Satish's 90 helped the Karnataka set a tall target of 343. In reply, Ravi Teja's century went in vain as the six-wicket haul from Ronit More troubled the Hyderabad who managed only 240. They finished inside top-2 in the South Zone with four wins and a loss to advance to the knockout stage as they upset the Tamil Nadu by 36 runs in their final zonal match. The opening stand of 151 between Ravi Teja and Tirumalasetti Suman helped the Hyderabad set the target of 334. It was Ravi Teja again whose fifer did the damage as the Tamil Nadu were bowled out for 297. The Hyderabad were eliminated in the quarter-final as Bipul Sharma and Rahul Sharma restricted the Hyderabad to 175 and set up the Punjab's five-wicket win.

Points Table
South Zone

Knockout stage

Matches
Zonal Stage

Quarter-final

Statistics
Most runs

 Source: Cricinfo
Most wickets

 Source: Cricinfo

See also
Hyderabad cricket team 
Hyderabad Cricket Association

References

External links
Hyderabad cricket team official site

Cricket in Hyderabad, India
Cricket in Telangana
Sport in Telangana